"Emotionally Scarred" is a song by American rapper Lil Baby. It was released as the third single from his album My Turn on April 15, 2020. The track peaked at number 31 on the Billboard Hot 100.

Background 
On the track, Lil Baby was a 13 year old and he talked about his emotional trauma, lack of trust in relationships, his shortcomings as a human and his current position in the new-school rap game.

Music video 
A music video for the track was released on April 30, 2020. The video was directed by Keemotion.

Remix 
Rapper NLE Choppa released a remix to the track, titled "Different Day", on May 24, 2020.

Live performance 
Lil Baby performed the song live for Vevo on March 5, 2020.

Charts

Weekly charts

Year-end charts

Certifications

References 

Lil Baby songs
2020 singles
2020 songs
Songs written by Lil Baby
Motown singles